The Blazing Temple (火燒少林寺) is a 1976 independently released Hong Kong martial arts film directed by Joseph Kuo, starring Chang Yi and Carter Wong.

Plot
After discovering that Shaolin is linked with Liu and the Eight Swordsmen - all rebels, Emperor Yong Zheng orders General Kim and his cannon squad to lay waste to the Temple. With little warning, Kim's soldiers begin to fire on the Temple, causing massive death and destruction. Despite the severity of the situation, the abbot orders that the only way students may leave the Temple is by passing through the hall of 18 Bronzemen, in keeping with Temple tradition. Students pour into the hall, ill-prepared to face the rigors of the Bronzemen.

After agonizing over his loss of judgment, the abbot rushes to open another escape route by holding up an enormous stone while students rush underneath. Unable to save himself, the abbot gives the final copy of the famed "18 styles" of kung fu to his trusted student Siu (Carter Wong). Having escaped, Siu and the remaining students and teachers hide from their Manchu pursuers while plotting to kill the Emperor. As one attempt fails, their hopes are set on a final plot, of which the success or failure rests upon a fellow Shaolin monk-turned-traitor.

Cast
Carter Wong
Jia Ling
Chang Yi

External links 
 
 HK cinemagic entry

Kung fu films
Hong Kong martial arts films
Films directed by Joseph Kuo
Films set in the Qing dynasty
1976 martial arts films
1976 films
1970s Hong Kong films